Bridges of Love is a 2015 Philippine soap opera romance television series directed by Richard V. Somes and Will Fredo, starring Jericho Rosales, Paulo Avelino and Maja Salvador. The series was aired on ABS-CBN's Primetime Bida afternoon block and worldwide on The Filipino Channel from March 16, 2015, to August 7, 2015, replacing Two Wives, and was succeeded by On the Wings of Love.

Currently streaming on Kapamilya Online Live February 13 Weeknights 10:15 PM Replacing The Better Half (TV series) & Cable TV Available on Jeepney TV

Synopsis
The story follows the lives of two brothers, Gael and Carlos, bound by their promise to support each other, but separated by an unfortunate accident. Carlos is adopted by a wealthy architect and developer and grows up in wealth. Gael returns to his parents who are poor. He grows up to fulfill his dream to build bridges and becomes a successful and sought after engineer. They cross paths as adults but do not recognize each other. They will be bridged together by love for the same lady-of-interest—Mia, who is Gael's greatest love, and the woman who completes Carlos' broken heart.

Cast and characters

Main cast
 Maja Salvador as Mia Sandoval
 Paulo Avelino as Carlos Antonio / Manuel "JR" Nakpil, Jr.
 Jericho Rosales as Gabriel "Gael" Nakpil

Supporting cast
 Edu Manzano as Lorenzo Antonio
 Carmina Villarroel as Alexa Meyers Antonio
 Antoinette Taus as Arch. Camille Panlilio
 Janus del Prado as Romulo "Muloy" Angeles
 Isabel Oli-Prats as Atty. Malaya Cabrera-Nakpil
 Lito Pimentel as Manuel Nakpil, Sr.
 Maureen Mauricio as Marilen Mendoza-Nakpil
 Malou de Guzman as Manang Vida
 William Lorenzo as Ramon Sandoval
 Max Eigenmann as Georgina Calix
 Justin Cuyugan as Henson Lee
 John Manalo as Manuel "Tres" Nakpil, III
 Jopay Paguia as Venus de Castro
 Joross Gamboa as Toto Rosales
 Marilyn Villamayor as Chanda de Castro
 Manuel Chua as Abner Carillo
 Nikka Valencia as Tiyang Des Carillo

Guest cast
 Bugoy Cariño as young Gabriel "Gael" Nakpil
 Izzy Canillo as young Manuel "JR" Nakpil, Jr.
 Desiree del Valle as young Marilen Mendoza-Nakpil
 Jason Abalos as young Manuel Nakpil, Sr.
 Baron Geisler as young Lorenzo Antonio
 Grae Fernandez as teenage Manuel "JR" Nakpil, Jr. / Carlos Antonio
 Jairus Aquino as teenage Gabriel "Gael" Nakpil
 Lance Lucido as young Romulo "Muloy" Angeles
 Jerould Aceron as teenage Romulo "Muloy" Angeles
 Janice Jurado as Nancy Angeles
 Encar Benedicto as Teacher Yolly
 Kyle Blanco as Kyle
 Lorenzo Mara as Tony Meyers
 Toby Alejar as Robert Panlilio
 Alvin Anson as Willy
 Carla Humphries as Ivanka Valera
 Hiyasmin Neri as Priscilla Angeles
 Lei Andrei Navarro as Wolfgang Angeles
 Jordan Herrera as Bernard Briones
 Johan Santos as Enrique Hidalgo
 AJ Dee as Louie Sandejas
 Menggie Cobarrubias as Chairman Luna
 Bing Davao as Robert Torralba
 Eda Nolan as Michelle
 Maria Isabel Lopez as Veronica Sandoval
 Niña Dolino as young Veronica
 Akiko Solon as Alisa Almeda
 Charles Christianson as Eugene
 Inez Bernardo as Ms. Pierre
 Mike Lloren as Raffy
 Ces Aldaba as Malaya's grandfather

Soundtrack
 Pusong Ligaw - Michael Pangilinan
 Ikaw Na Nga - Daryl Ong

International Broadcast
 The series was aired in Indonesia on MNCTV and dubbed in Indonesian, one of the main commercial TV networks of the country from February 17, 2017.

Production
Dubbed as "a story like no other", Bridges of Love is a soap opera directed by Dado Lumibao of the critically acclaimed melodrama, The Legal Wife, and Richard Somes of the highly successful horror-fantasy drama, Imortal. It is written by G3 San Diego from Magkaribal, and head writer Benjamin Lingan from Apoy Sa Dagat. Filming of the series began on September 12, 2014.

During commercial gap of the romantic-comedy series, Forevermore, the teaser released on February 18, 2015, and the full trailer premiered on February 25, 2015.

Casting
Prior to its unveiling, the soap opera made headlines because of changes in its casting. John Lloyd Cruz was originally part of the main cast, who at the time could not commit as he had yet to renew his contract with ABS-CBN. Cruz was later replaced by Xian Lim, but was eventually reassigned by management to co-star anew with Kim Chiu for a third series together. On January 10, 2015, Lim was officially replaced by Paulo Avelino. This was Avelino second time playing an antagonist role since Walang Haggan in 2012.

The series marks the reunion of Rosales and Salvador, who previously starred together as husband and mistress respectively in The Legal Wife in 2014. It is also the first team-up of Rosales, Avelino and Salvador as previous Gawad Urian awardees. Meanwhile, the soap opera is Edu Manzano and Antoinette Taus' comeback project as returning Kapamilya stars. Meanwhile, this is Carmina Villarroel's return to primetime after the success of Got to Believe in 2013, opposite Kathryn Bernardo and Daniel Padilla, the series ended on March 7, 2014.

Reception

Ratings

Awards and recognitions

See also
List of programs broadcast by ABS-CBN
List of telenovelas of ABS-CBN

References

External links
 

ABS-CBN drama series
2015 Philippine television series debuts
2015 Philippine television series endings
Philippine romance television series
Television series by Star Creatives
Philippine melodrama television series
Philippine crime television series
Thriller television series
Television shows filmed in the Philippines
Television shows filmed in Japan
Television shows filmed in Saudi Arabia
Filipino-language television shows